Graham Cave State Park is a state park in the U.S. state of Missouri consisting of  located in Montgomery County. The cave protects an historically important Pre-Columbian archaeological site dating back to as early as 10,000 years ago. Visitors are allowed up to the entrance of the cave where interpretive signs point out significant discoveries. The park includes the  Graham Cave Glades Natural Area which protects an area of sandstone and dolomite glades with a rich diversity of glade species. The park is adjacent to Interstate 70 from which the entrance to the cave can be glimpsed during foliage-free months.

History
In 1847, settler Robert Graham purchased the property containing the cave, and the land remained in the Graham family until it was donated to the state for a state park in 1964 by Frances Graham Darnell, Robert's great-granddaughter. Robert Graham's son, D. F. Graham, sheltered hogs in the cave and became interested in archeology from the artifacts he found there. His collection of artifacts was offered by his son Benjamin to the University of Missouri, which investigated the cave in 1930.  Benjamin's son-in-law, Wade Darnell, was persuaded to delay plans to enlarge the shelter for his livestock in 1948 so that archeological excavations could be made. The University of Missouri and the Missouri Archaeological Society excavated the cave between 1949 and 1961. The importance of the findings in that period resulted in the site being the first archaeological site in the United States to be designated a National Historical Landmark in 1961. Frances Graham Darnell donated the cave and surrounding land to the state of Missouri in 1964 to be a state park.

Artifacts recovered from the cave indicate that the cave's inhabitants used spears to hunt and fish. A ring of smaller stones surrounding a larger stone was found in the cave, suggesting that ceremonies were held. Pottery shows that more recent Native Americans also lived in the cave.

Activities and amenities
The state park offers access to the Loutre River for boating and fishing, hiking trails named Fern Ridge, Loutre River, and Indian Glade, and camping facilities.

References

External links

 Graham Cave State Park Missouri Department of Natural Resources
 Graham Cave State Park Map Missouri Department of Natural Resources

State parks of Missouri
Protected areas of Montgomery County, Missouri
Protected areas established in 1964
1964 establishments in Missouri